Ruawahine Irihapeti Faulkner (? – 24 September 1855) was a New Zealand tribal leader and landowner. Of Māori descent, she identified with the Ngai Te Rangi iwi. She was born in New Zealand. She was married to John Lees Faulkner.

References

Year of birth unknown
1855 deaths
Ngāi Te Rangi people